Marooned in Iraq (and also known as Songs of My Motherland ) is a 2002 Iranian (Kurdish/Persian) film directed by Bahman Ghobadi and produced in Iran. It was screened in the Un Certain Regard section at the 2002 Cannes Film Festival.

Plot
Mirza, a famous Kurdish musician, hears that his (ex-)wife, Hanareh, is in trouble. Accompanied by his two sons, he embarks on an adventurous journey across the Iran-Iraq border to find her.

Cast
 Shahab Ebrahimi - Mirza
 Faegh Mohamadi - Barat
 Allah-Morad Rashtian - Audeh
 Rojan Hosseini - Rojan
 Saeed Mohammadi - The Teacher
 Iran Ghobadi - Hanareh

Awards
Gold Plaque, Chicago International Film Festival, 2002.
François Chalais Award, Cannes Film Festival, 2002
International Jury Award, São Paulo International Film Festival, Brazil, 2002.
Aurora and Don Quixote Awards, Tromsø International Film Festival, Norway, 2003.

See also 
 Kurdish Cinema

References

External links 
Marooned in Iraq, Official website.
 

2002 films
Kurdish films
Kurdish-language films
2000s Persian-language films
Films directed by Bahman Ghobadi
2002 drama films
Films set in Iraq
Films set in Iran
Iranian drama films